Luke Thomas Armstrong (born 2 July 1996) is an English professional footballer who plays as a striker for League Two club Harrogate Town.

Club career

Early career
Armstrong began his career with Middlesbrough, making his way up through the academy teams until he was released by the club in the summer of 2014. He subsequently joined Birmingham City's youth setup on a one-year deal after a successful trial period but would leave after he was informed that his contract with Birmingham City would not be renewed in the summer of 2015.

Armstrong then had a successful trial period with Scottish League One outfit Cowdenbeath, leading to him being handed a one-year deal. After six months with the club, Armstrong decided to terminate his contract due his game time being limited to just a few substitute appearances during the half-season.

Following this setback, Armstrong would join Northern Premier League Premier Division club Blyth Spartans, which was then managed by his father, Alun Armstrong. He would score 23 goals across the season, helping his team to win the Northumberland Senior Cup and league title, ultimately attracting the attention of one of his previous employers in the form of Middlesbrough.

Return to Middlesbrough and loans
On 16 July 2018, Armstrong joined National League club Gateshead on loan until the end of the season. On 29 July 2018, he notably scored a hat-trick against his former club Blyth Spartans during a 3–1 victory in a friendly at Croft Park. After scoring on his Heed début, Armstrong would score two goals against Salford City in a 2–1 victory. He went on to make 18 appearances for the club, during which he scored a further seven goals, by the time his loan was cut short by parent club Middlesbrough on 31 December 2018.

Upon his return to Middlesbrough, Armstrong would sign a new two and a half year contract with the Championship club, before being shipped out on loan to Accrington Stanley of League One on 11 January 2019. He made his debut for the club the next day, in a goalless League One tie versus Bristol Rovers at the Wham Stadium.

Salford City
On 26 July 2019, Armstrong joined newly promoted League Two outfit Salford City on a permanent transfer, signing a three year contract. He scored his first goal against Walsall, opening the scoring in a 3–0 triumph as Salford won away for the first time in the English Football League.

On 7 December 2020, Armstrong joined Hartlepool United until the end of the 2020–21 season on loan. Armstrong scored a brace on his debut for Hartlepool in a 2–0 win against King's Lynn. Armstrong went on to score 15 goals in all competitions for Pools, including one in their 2021 National League play-off Final win against Torquay United.

Harrogate Town
On 26 June 2021 it was announced that he has signed for Harrogate Town for an undisclosed fee. Armstrong signed a new contract at the end of the 2021–22 season that would keep him at the club until the summer of 2025.

Personal life
Luke is the son of former Stockport County, Middlesbrough and Ipswich Town striker Alun Armstrong. He attended Wolsingham School and is a qualified personal trainer having picked up a Level 3 qualification at Darlington College.

In December 2021, Armstrong opened a cafe in Wolsingham called No 10.

Career statistics

Honours
Blyth Spartans
Northern Premier League Premier Division: 2016–17

Hartlepool United
National League play-offs: 2021

References

1996 births
Living people
Sportspeople from Durham, England
Footballers from County Durham
English footballers
Association football forwards
Middlesbrough F.C. players
Birmingham City F.C. players
Cowdenbeath F.C. players
Blyth Spartans A.F.C. players
Gateshead F.C. players
Accrington Stanley F.C. players
Salford City F.C. players
Hartlepool United F.C. players
Scottish Professional Football League players
Northern Premier League players
National League (English football) players
English Football League players
Harrogate Town A.F.C. players